The Iguatemi São Paulo shopping centre is the oldest Brazilian mall in operation.

See also 
 Daslu
 Shopping Mall

References

External links 
 Official website (in Portuguese)

Shopping malls established in 1966
Shopping malls in São Paulo